Tristão Ferreira da Cunha (Teófilo Otoni, 27 July 1890Rio de Janeiro, 2 January 1974) was a Brazilian politician, lawyer and scholar.

In 1934, he was elected constituent state deputy for the Partido Republicano Mineiro, but his term was interrupted by the establishment of the Estado Novo regime.

He was father of Aécio Ferreira da Cunha and grandfather of Aécio Neves.

References

1890 births
1974 deaths
20th-century Brazilian lawyers
Members of the Chamber of Deputies (Brazil) from Minas Gerais